
Gmina Jaktorów is a rural gmina (administrative district) in Grodzisk Mazowiecki County, Masovian Voivodeship, in east-central Poland.

Villages
Gmina Jaktorów contains the villages and settlements of Bieganów, Budy Michałowskie, Budy Zosine, Budy-Grzybek, Chylice, Chylice-Kolonia, Chylice-Osada, Grabnik, Grądy, Henryszew, Jaktorów, Jaktorów-Kolonia, Jaktorów-Osada, Kołaczek, Mariampol, Maruna, Międzyborów, Sade Budy and Stare Budy.

Neighbouring gminas
Gmina Jaktorów is bordered by the town of Żyrardów and by the gminas of Baranów, Grodzisk Mazowiecki, Radziejowice and Wiskitki.

References
Polish official population figures 2006

Jaktorow
Grodzisk Mazowiecki County